The Chirpan–Plovdiv earthquakes struck central Bulgaria, south of the Sredna Gora on two separate days in April 1928. The event consisted of two main earthquakes that had a moment magnitude of 7.1, occurring four days apart on the 14th and 18th respectively. Major damage was reported, with over 70,000 buildings collapsing. An estimated 127 people died in both earthquakes, with many thousands affected in its aftermath. The two powerful earthquakes could also be felt in Greece, where they also caused significant damage. The cost of damage totaled 5 billion Bulgarian lev.

Earthquake  
The earthquake pair involved a rupture of two separate faults. A 2002 research revealed that the young fault was active during the Pleistocene epoch, and well into the Holocene. Three colluvial wedges were found along the hanging wall suggesting three prehistoric earthquakes have occurred and caused surface ruptures. Using the dates of the events, an average recurrence interval of 2350 ± 643 years was presented for earthquakes comparable to the 1928 earthquake.

Meanwhile, the second earthquake was caused by the rupture of ten fault structures. A small dextral component was also observed. Coulomb stress transfer after the April 14th earthquake is thought to have triggered the second event.

Impact 

Both earthquakes achieved a maximum intensity of IX–X on the Medvedev–Sponheuer–Karnik scale and X–XI on the Mercalli intensity scale, causing major damage to the surrounding towns and villages. At least 74,570 buildings were obliterated while another 21,000 left partially destroyed in 240 towns and villages. Nearly every building in Chirpan and Parvomay collapsed as a result of the two earthquakes. The extreme shaking also bent and snapped railway tracks. Over 264,000 residents in the affected area became homeless when their homes were damaged. Many of the survivors slept outside their homes for fear that more aftershocks would collapse them. Plovdiv which was severely affected by the earthquake suffered further destruction when the second mainshock struck closer to the city.

Because the first earthquake took place on a Holy Saturday, many residents were outside their houses thus were not injured or killed when they collapsed. An estimated 402 schools were destroyed but since it was a holiday, little to there were no deaths.

In Thessaloniki, Greece, the earthquakes caused panic among residents and there was some light damage to the walls of houses. The shaking collapsed a house in Komotini and caused large cracks to appear in the walls of buildings. Two additional homes collapsed in another Greek town while in Eleftheroupoli, a police station collapsed.

Response

Tsar Boris III of Bulgaria was in Vrana Palace at the time of the disaster was brought to Chirpan, and later Plovdiv where he led a rescue mission to provide aid to victims.

Gallery

See also 
List of earthquakes in 1928
List of earthquakes in Bulgaria

References

External links
BULGARIA: POPOVITSA
BULGARIA: CHIRPAN
BULGARIA / EARTHQUAKES: Scenes of ruined city after devastating earthquake (1928)

Earthquakes in Bulgaria
Earthquakes in Greece
Chirpan–Plovdiv earthquakes
Chirpan–Plovdiv earthquakes
Chirpan–Plovdiv earthquakes
Doublet earthquakes